The women's T11 100 metres competition of the athletics events at the 2015 Parapan American Games was held on August 11 at the CIBC Athletics Stadium. The defending Parapan American Games champion was Terezinha Guilhermina of Brazil.

Records
Prior to this competition, the existing world and Americas records were as follows:

Schedule
All times are Central Standard Time (UTC-6).

Results
All times are shown in seconds.

Final
Wind +3.1 m/s

References

Athletics at the 2015 Parapan American Games
Para